Dövranlı is a village and municipality in the Goychay Rayon of Azerbaijan. It has a population of 326.

References

Populated places in Goychay District